Rosemarie Allen is an American academic specialized in diversity, equity, and inclusion. She is an associate professor of early childhood development at the Metropolitan State University of Denver and president and chief executive officer for the Institute for Racial Equity and Excellence.

Early life and education 
Allen was raised in South-Central Los Angeles, California. She completed her B.A. from California State University, Long Beach. Allen earned a Master of Education from Lesley University and a Doctor of Education in Equity and Leadership in Education at the University of Colorado Denver.

Career 
Allen's works specialize in early childhood development, diversity, equity, and inclusion. She has authored three children's books on diversity. Allen served in directorship roles with the Colorado Department of Human Services as the director of the division of early learning and in youth corrections. Allen joined the faculty at Metropolitan State University of Denver in 2004 and is an associate professor of early childhood education. She is the president and CEO for the Institute for Racial Equity and Excellence, a nonprofit organization which licenses child care providers in three counties in Colorado.

Selected works

References

External links

Living people
1950 births
People from South Los Angeles
African-American women academics
American women academics
African-American academics
21st-century American women writers
Metropolitan State University of Denver
California State University, Long Beach alumni
Lesley University alumni
University of Colorado Denver alumni
21st-century African-American women writers
21st-century African-American writers
20th-century African-American people
20th-century African-American women